Epiphthora nivea is a moth of the family Gelechiidae. It was described by Philpott in 1930. It is found in New Zealand, where it has only been recorded from the Waitākere Ranges.

The larvae feed on Collospermum hastatum.

References

Moths described in 1930
Epiphthora
Moths of New Zealand
Endemic fauna of New Zealand
Endemic moths of New Zealand